Ballard is an unincorporated community in Anderson County, in the U.S. state of Kentucky.

History
A post office was established at Ballard in 1893, and remained in operation until 1904. Thomas Ballard was credited with successfully petitioning for the establishment of the post office.

References

Unincorporated communities in Anderson County, Kentucky
Unincorporated communities in Kentucky